The Supreme Oppressor is the second EP released by Reading metal band Sylosis.

Track listing

Personnel
 Jamie Graham - vocals
 Josh Middleton - guitars
 Gurneet Ahluwalia - guitars
 Carl Parnell - bass
 Chris Steele - drums

References

Sylosis albums
2007 EPs